Remueru Tekiate is a Fijian footballer who plays as a defender for Suva F.C. After moving in from Ba F.C. in 2018.

International career

International goals
Scores and results list Fiji's goal tally first.

References 

Living people
1990 births
Fijian footballers
Fiji international footballers
Hekari United players
Ba F.C. players
2012 OFC Nations Cup players
2016 OFC Nations Cup players
Association football defenders